The 1948 All-Ireland Senior Camogie Championship Final was the seventeenth All-Ireland Final and the deciding match of the 1948 All-Ireland Senior Camogie Championship, an inter-county camogie tournament for the top teams in Ireland.

The final, unusually, was played on a Saturday. An inexperienced Down side, playing their first final, lost by twenty-three points. Dublin's Kathleen Cody, Sophie Brack and J. Cosgrave all scored hat-tricks.

References

All-Ireland Senior Camogie Championship Finals
All-Ireland Senior Camogie Championship Final
Camogie Championship Final
Dublin county camogie team matches
Camogie Championship Final
All-Ireland Senior Camogie Championship Final, 1948